bidorbuy or bidorbuy.co.za (officially written as one word, all-lowercase; variations: bid or buy, BidOrBuy and Bid or Buy) is an English-language e-commerce website based on an internet auction and online marketplace model allowing individuals and businesses to trade with each other. Transactions on bidorbuy are in South African rands.

History
bidorbuy was first launched by Andy Higgins in August 1999 at the height of the dotcom boom, in Higgins' native South Africa. The initial seed funding and continued support were provided by Professor Yair Tauman, Professor Abraham Neyman, Mr Danny Barnea and Mr Zohar Gilon.
bidorbuy was officially launched with a massive marketing campaign in January 2000, led by Nitzan Tal as the managing director, and within months made bidorbuy one of the leading e-businesses and one of the strongest internet brands in South Africa. This campaign won 2 APEX awards for the 2000 launch campaign. Between February and April, 2000 Nitzan Tal launched the websites in India and Australia. In 2001, after the dotcom crash, the Australian site was closed and the Indian one merged with the former main competitor, Baazee.com (which was bought by eBay in 2004).
In October 2001 Higgins went on to run the South African operation. At the slowest point, the company employed only one other person. From 2005 things started to change with the adoption of broadband, always-on internet access by businesses and private users in South Africa. bidorbuy.co.za soon became the largest online marketplace of its kind in South Africa and Africa. 
In 2010, bidorbuy made an investment into PayFast.co.za, a local online payment solutions company. 
In May 2014 bidorbuy invested into the e-commerce company uAfrica.com.

In August 2022, bidorbuy formally merged with uAfrica to form a new company known as Bob Group. Bob Group was created to offer ‘everything ecommerce’ to all online buyers and merchants in South Africa, with a range of planned services all operating under the Bob Group umbrella. Subsequently, in March 2023, new identities were revealed for each Bob Group service, with uAfrica changing its name to Bob Go and bidorbuy being renamed as Bob Shop.

Basic concept
bidorbuy follows the eBay business model. It is an online auction site and marketplace where users, buyers and sellers, transact with each other. Anyone over the age of 18 can transact on the site, providing they respect the site's terms and conditions.
The aim of the consumer-to-consumer auction sites and marketplaces like bidorbuy is to supply a trading model that enables small retailers, or even hobby sellers, to be seen by a larger audience of potential customers, who may be geographically distant. For buyers, such sites supply a place to go to buy commodities at discounted prices, second-hand items or difficult to find collectibles.

Types of users

Buyers and sellers

After registering on the site and activating the account, anyone over the age of 18 can become a buyer on bidorbuy.  New users can also start selling immediately as basic sellers, with restricted scope of activities. Advanced sellers need to have their bank or credit card details confirmed.

Verified users

Both sellers and buyers can become verified users after submitting a copy of their ID book, signed indemnity form and paying a fee for having their credit standing checked out. Verified users are identified with a green tick mark next to their user name.
Only purchases from verified sellers fall under the bidorbuy Buyer Protection Programme, which offers a limited compensation to buyers under specific conditions.

Affiliates

All registered users may participate in the bidorbuy Affiliate Programme. For bidorbuy affiliates to earn commission, the newly registered users referred from an affiliate's web site, blog or invitation email message have to bid on an auction, buy an item at a fixed price, or list an item for sale within 60 days of registration.
If a visitor sent to bidorbuy is already a registered user, the referring site gets a small commission every time such a user places a bid on bidorbuy.

Rating System

The rating system is meant to give buyers and sellers an idea about the reputation of their prospective trading partner before concluding a transaction on the site. Buyers rate sellers based on the service and the quality of the product, and sellers rate buyers on the basis of prompt payments and ease of transaction.
There are three kinds of ratings on bidorbuy: positive, negative and neutral. For every positive, the users receive a point. For every negative, they lose a point. There is no effect from a neutral rating.

Items traded on the site
Trading in collectible items, mainly in the auction format, was the foundation on which bidorbuy was built. While collectible items, notably South African coins, stamps, antiques, etc. are still very popular, bidorbuy has branched out into other categories, to encompass all imaginable products that can be traded in legally.
In 2008, bidorbuy focused on developing its car section, attracting many car dealerships to list on the site, making it one of the biggest online car shop windows in South Africa.
Later on in 2008 the property section of the site was expanded when trade feeds from several online property agencies were incorporated into bidorbuy.
There is a purposeful endeavour on the part of the company to distance itself from a site that only offers second-hand bric-a-brac and instead to grow the trade in brand-new items of mass consumption.  To that end, bidorbuy has enabled the sellers who have their own e-commerce sites to integrate their shopping cart with bidorbuy and largely automate the listing procedure.
As of January 2012, bidorbuy had 32 main categories, each with several sub-categories. With the property subcategories, which are ordered by cities and even suburbs, the total number of categories and subcategories surpassed 3,000.

Trading formats
 Auctions. In the beginning, bidorbuy featured only online auctions.
 Buy Now. In 2001, bidorbuy introduced the buy now format for selling items at fixed prices.
 Classifieds. In 2005, bidorbuy introduced a classifieds section where sellers can display items that may not lend themselves easily for sale on the internet, like second-hand cars, property and services.
 Buy Now and Auctions with Make an Offer. In May 2015, bidorbuy introduced a Make an Offer functionality, first for Buy Now and later on for Auctions, which allows buyers and sellers to negotiate the price.  
 Auctions with Buy Now.  In November 2015, bidorbuy gave sellers the option to include a Buy Now price in their auction listings.

Payment Methods
bobPay-EFT (internet transfer) was developed by bidorbuy to enable almost instantaneous internet payments across the four big South African banks: Absa, FNB, Nedbank and Standard Bank (in South Africa, a two or three-day delays are a norm in internet banking). 
bobPay Credit card allows the verified bidorbuy sellers who do not have an internet credit card merchant account to accept credit card payments from customers. Other payment methods are also offered, including shopping on credit and PayPal.

Fees
bidorbuy does not charge listing fees for listing an item for sale in the auction or buy now format. A success fee is charged only upon a successful sale of the item. This success fee is calculated as a percentage of the actual purchase value.
Items listed in the Classifieds section are not subject to paying the success fee. Instead, the sellers who list their items in the Classifieds pay a flat listing fee.
Items listed in any of the trading formats – auctions, buy-now or classifieds – can be "enhanced" (advertised on the home page and other sections of the site on a rotating basis) for a specified flat fee.

Charity fund raising
bidorbuy allows registered charities or non-profit organisations to raise funds on the site. In 2009, charities raised over R425,000 through sales on this platform.
The biggest amount, R300,100 was raised for the Ubuntu Education Fund through the sale of the last VW Citi Golf ever made for the general public by the seller Volkswagen South Africa. In the same year, the Celebrities for Charities Auctions event was held on the site, in which 39 celebrities, most notably the archbishop Desmond Tutu, auctioned their time to raise funds for charities. In 2011, several South African celebrities participated in the Celebrity for Charity auctions benefiting charities including Reach for a Dream and Johannesburg Child Welfare.
In March 2016, the Vodacom Blue Bulls rugby team auctioned off on bidorbuy 23 pink jerseys signed by the players, with the proceeds going to the Cancer Association of South Africa (CANSA).
The #SamsungHeroes online event, organised on bidorbuy in July 2016 by Samsung South Africa to mark the launch of Samsung Galaxy S7 edge Injustice Edition, saw three pairs of South African celebrities engage in three charitable auction duels. The celebrities competed to see who would raise more funds for the charity they chose, and the participating bidders stood a chance to win one of three Injustice Edition smartphones.

Entrepreneurship advancement activities
On several occasions, bidorbuy teamed up with institutions of higher learning to promote entrepreneurship among young South Africans. The bidorbuy representatives gave free introductory workshops to students and guided them through the entire cycle of selling online, from sourcing of the goods to the fulfilment of a transaction.
The tutorials, under the name The bidorbuy Auction Challenge, were taken by 60 students of the University of Johannesburg Raymond Ackerman Academy of Entrepreneurial Development in January 2010 and by 50 students of the Investment Society at the University of Cape Town (InvestSoc) in March 2010.
The site reports that up to 20% of the people selling goods on its site now make a living by doing so.

Notable and controversial listings
 Plastic surgery procedures auctioned on bidorbuy (July 2000).
 The R5 circulation Mandela coins controversy (July 2008)
 Unreleased stamps marking the tenure of the President of South Africa President Kgalema Motlanthe (March 2009)
 A voter tried to auction his vote on bidorbuy (April 2009)
Rare ZAR Veldpond coin sold for R450,000 (July 2010)
 An attempt to sell rough diamonds on bidorbuy (August 2010)
 A dress worn by DA leader Helen Zille auctioned on bidorbuy for charity (March 2010)
 An attempt to auction toilet paper with the image of ANCYL leader Julius Malema (November 2010)
 First Afrikaans vampire film memorabilia auctioned on bidorbuy (June 2011)
 ANC centenary gold coins listed for sale on bidorbuy (October 2011)
 Simultaneous chess game with Garry Kasparov auctioned on bidorbuy (October 2011)
 Vest worn by Justin Bieber auctioned on bidorbuy (June 2013)
 Edible chocolate painting auctioned on bidorbuy (April 2014).
 SAHA auctions Shifty Records memorabilia on bidorbuy (September 2014).
 Dress made out of loom bands auctioned on bidorbuy (December 2014).
 A Half-a-Million Coin: Bidorbuy (April 2015).
 Rare coin set to break record in online auction (February 2017).
 Demand for water related items spikes on bidorbuy as #DayZero draws closer (February 2018).
 Fifa World Cup sparks interest in soccer memorabilia (June 2018).

Awards
 Public's Favourite E-Commerce Website and Best E-Commerce Services Website in the 2011 Jump Shopping South African E-Commerce Awards.
 The winner in the Enterprise category of the 2011 Clickatell Personalised Priority Messaging (PPM)Awards
 Best eCommerce Services Website in the 2012 South African E-Commerce Awards.
 Best Customer Service Website in the 2013 South African E-Commerce Awards.
 Best App for Africa on Africacom 2013 - the bidorbuy Android app.
 Nominee in the MTN business app of the year 2014 - the bidorbuy Android app.
 Finalist in the App Circus 2014 - the bidorbuy Android app.
 Best eCommerce Services Platform in the 2014 South African E-Commerce Awards.
 Best eCommerce Services Platform in the 2015 South African E-Commerce Awards.
 Best Online Market Platform in 2016 South African E-Commerce Awards.
 Best Online Market Platform in 2017 South African E-Commerce Awards.

References

Further reading
 Book Your Guide to Buying and Selling on bidorbuy , 2009, 
 Academic paper: Wits Business School case study: bidorbuy – Biding for First Place 
 My Broadband: Biggest South African Websites December 2011
 Entrepreneur Magazine: Success Stories: Bidorbuy – Andy Higgins

External links
 Official website

Online auction websites of South Africa
Economy of Johannesburg